Susan Shaw born Susan Mahon (12 August 1932 – 13 June 2020) was a publisher and the  British founder of the Type Museum in London. Her publishing house created limited edition books that can sell for thousands of pounds a copy.

Life
Shaw was born in Aylesbury in 1932. Her parents were Constance (born Peach) and Thomas Mahon. Her schooling was aperiodic as her father's job as a tax inspector meant that the family was always moving to a new location. She loved books but did not go to university but worked at Butlins. She and her sister toured the continent on Vespa scooters.

She entered publishing when she applied to Penguin whilst she was working for Derby Libraries. She worked for several of the leading book publishers.

She founded the Merrion Press which in 1960 published  Wolperiana, which featured drawings made by Charles Mozley of Berthold Wolpe. There were 335 numbered copies with 150 of them signed by the artist. Wolpe was one of her heroes. He was a Jewish German designer known for creating the Albertus typeface and 1,500 book cover designs for Faber & Faber. Shaw had also worked for many years at Faber & Faber. In 1964 she married Montague Shaw and they had two sons, Thomas and Patrick. Both children predeceased their parents.

Her second book was another about design. This time Merrion Press created a facsimile edition of a book by Johann David Steingrüber who was an architect. In 1773 he had published a book that featured the designs of letter shaped houses. The book was called Architectural Alphabet and illustrated her professional approach to book design.

In 1992 she founded the Type Museum (now called the Type Archive) in Stockwell in south London. The museum curates the manufacturing plants of type founders and letter makers in a building that was once an animal hospital. The collection was originally based on the equipment of Monotype and Shaw had to fight off suggestions that the equipment should be housed in one of the science museum's warehouses. 

The Heritage Lottery Fund came to her aid in 1996 so that the machinery and equipment of Stephenson Blake and Robert DeLittle could be loaded up and sent to South London. The museum now has substantial collections from the Sheffield typefounders Stephenson Blake, the York wood letter makers Robert DeLittle and Monotype.

Shaw had an appreciation of design including the work of Lucie Rie. In time Rie gave Shaw some bowls including her own egg cup.

In 2000 she completed the work that she had been given by the Roxburghe Club to publish a facsimile copy of "The Great Book of Thomas Trevilian" in two volumes. The book was to be given to the club's members. A copy of Shaw's facsimile book in 2020 was on sale for £2,200. The sellers claim that it is "perhaps" the "greatest monument to the arts of the book at the turn of the twentieth century".

In 2016 the address of the Type Archive was changed when the street where it is was renamed "Alphabet Mews". When she died in 2020 she was credited with keeping knowledge of "letterpress and type design alive".

References

1932 births
2020 deaths
People from Aylesbury
British publishers (people)
Book designers